The 11th/17th Consolidated Arkansas Infantry (1861–1865) was a Confederate Army infantry regiment during the American Civil War. The unit is also known as the 11th/17th Arkansas Mounted Infantry or the 11th/17th Arkansas Cavalry. At various times after the consolidation, members of the unit who were captured gave their unit as either the 11th Arkansas Cavalry or the 17th Arkansas Cavalry.

Organization 

In March 1863, the 11th Arkansas Infantry Regiment and the 17th (Griffith's) Arkansas Infantry Regiment were consolidated to bring the strength of each unit to an acceptable number.  Col. John L. Logan assumed command, since he was the senior Colonel superseding Col. John Griffith of the 17th Arkansas Infantry. Companies H and I of the Eleventh Arkansas were combined with Company C while the remaining companies remained the same. The companies of the Seventeenth Arkansas were combined into 3 companies, H, I, and K of the new consolidated regiment. Almost immediately the Confederate War Department ordered the unit mounted, with plans for it to serve as a mounted infantry rather than as Cavalry. The "footsore" troops gladly accepted their mounts and spent long hours drilling in this new branch of service.

Battles 
The men of the 11th/17th Infantry would spend the remainder of the war in Louisiana and Mississippi.  The men still carried long muskets but were not issued sabers and when in battle still operated on foot but only traveled from place to place on horseback. This decreased travel time by a large margin. Although the two regiments were from different parts of the State (the 11th Arkansas was mostly from Saline County and a few other southern counties), with different battle histories, the merger clicked. The first duties of the 11th/17th Infantry was to travel to Southeast Louisiana to slow Union advance while preparations were made upstream to meet the enemy.

The 11th & 17th Arkansas spent the rest of the war as the Confederate Army's 'fire brigade' in southern Mississippi. As Union columns made repeated incursions into the area over the next couple of years, the South's counter-moves invariably involved the 11th/17th Arkansas. General Benjamin Grierson's raid is a classic example of the duties of the 11/17th Arkansas.

Some members of the 11/17th Consolidated Arkansas Mounted Infantry were captured at Siege of Port Hudson on July 9, 1863. These men were later released and exchanged in Arkansas and many would later join Poe's Arkansas Cavalry Battalion or Logan's Arkansas Cavalry Regiment. In November 1863 Colonel John Logan was transferred from command of the 11th/17th Arkansas back west of the Mississippi River and Col. John Griffith was given command of the brigade which consisted of:.

11th/17th Arkansas Mounted Infantry.
14th Confederate Cavalry.
9th Louisiana Battalion.
9th Tennessee Battalion.
Stockdale's Mississippi Battalion.
Wilbourn's Mississippi Battalion.
Robert's Mississippi Battery.

With Colonel Logan called back west of the river and Colonel Griffith in command of the brigade, command of the 11th/17th Arkansas briefly fell to Lieutenant Colonel McDuff Vance of the 11th. Vance remained in command until November 23, 1863, when Colonel Wirt Adams was promoted to Brigadier General and was given command of the brigade. Col. Griffith was returned to the command of the 11t/17th Arkansas. Colonel Griffith seemed to have a sixth sense when it came to determining when and where to strike a larger enemy force to cause the most damage. The 11th & 17th Arkansas was renowned for its scouting and tracking abilities. The regiment served to the end of the war in this capacity.

The regiment was involved in the following engagements:

Siege, Port Hudson, Louisiana [detachment] – May 24–July 9, 1863.
Assault, Port Hudson, Louisiana [detachment] – May 27, 1863.
Assault, Port Hudson, Louisiana [detachment] – June 14, 1863.
Surrender, Port Hudson, Louisiana [detachment] – July 9, 1863.
Skirmish, Jackson, Louisiana – August 3, 1863.
Skirmishes, Canton Road, near Brownsville, Mississippi – October 15–16, 1863.
Skirmish, Treadwell Plantation, near Clinton and Vernon Cross Roads, Mississippi – October 16, 1863.
Action, Bogue Chitto Creek, Mississippi – October 17, 1863.
Skirmish, Clinton, Mississippi – October 17, 1863.
Skirmish, Livingston Road, near Clinton, Mississippi – October 18, 1863.
Skirmish, Brownsville, Mississippi – October 18, 1863.
Operations about Natchez, Mississippi – December 1–10, 1863.
Skirmish near Natchez, Mississippi – December 7, 1863.
Operations near Natchez, Mississippi – January 27, 1864.
Operations against the Expedition from Vicksburg to Meridian, Mississippi – February 3–March 2, 1864.
Skirmishes, Meridian, Mississippi – February 9–13, 1864.
Skirmish, Canton, Mississippi – February 23, 1864.
Skirmish near Canton, Mississippi – February 26, 1864.
Skirmish, Canton, Mississippi – February 27, 1864.
Skirmish near Canton, Mississippi – February 27–28, 1864.
Action, Pearl River, Mississippi [detachment] – 28 Feb 1864.
Skirmish, Canton, Mississippi – February 28, 1864.
Skirmishes near Mechanicsburg, Mississippi – April 20, 1864.
Affair near Yazoo City, Mississippi – April 22, 1864.
Capture, Yazoo City, Mississippi – April 23, 1864.
Skirmish, Port Gibson, Mississippi – July 14, 1864.
Skirmish near Memphis, Tennessee – October 10, 1864.
Skirmish near Memphis, Tennessee – October 25, 1864.
Operations against the Expedition from Vicksburg to Yazoo City, Mississippi – November 23–December 4, 1864.
Skirmish, Big Black River Bridge, Mississippi Central R. R., Mississippi – November 27, 1864.
Action, Concord Church, Mississippi – December 1, 1864.
Skirmish, Twelve Miles from Yazoo City, Mississippi – December 1, 1864.
Skirmish, Yazoo City, Mississippi – December 2, 1864.
Operations against the Expedition from Memphis, Tennessee – December 21, 1864 – January 5, 1865.
Action, Egypt Station, Mississippi – December 28, 1864.
Skirmish, Franklin, Mississippi – January 2, 1865.
Skirmish, Lexington, Mississippi – January 3, 1865.
Skirmish near Mechanicsburg, Mississippi – January 4, 1865.
Skirmish, The Ponds, Mississippi – January 4, 1865.

Surrender 
By May 13, 1865, most of the 11th/17th Arkansas had turned themselves in to Federal garrisons in Jackson, Miss. and were paroled.

See also 

List of Arkansas Civil War Confederate units
Lists of American Civil War Regiments by State
Confederate Units by State
Arkansas in the American Civil War
Arkansas Militia in the Civil War

References

External links 
11th/17th Consolidate Arkansas Infantry Website
Edward G. Gerdes Civil War Home Page
The Encyclopedia of Arkansas History and Culture 
The War of the Rebellion: a Compilation of the Official Records of the Union and Confederate Armies
The Arkansas History Commission, State Archives, Civil War in Arkansas 

Units and formations of the Confederate States Army from Arkansas
1865 disestablishments in Arkansas
Military units and formations disestablished in 1865
Military units and formations in Arkansas
Military in Arkansas
1863 establishments in Arkansas
Military units and formations established in 1863